Eupithecia oculata is a moth in the family Geometridae. It was described by David Stephen Fletcher in 1956. It is found in Cameroon and Equatorial Guinea.

References

Moths described in 1956
oculata
Moths of Africa